The Bensen B-9 Little Zipster was a small helicopter developed by Igor Bensen in the United States in the 1950s and marketed for home building. Similar in general configuration to Bensen's previous rotor kite and autogyro designs, it consisted of an open aluminum framework but substituted the autorotating main rotor for a coaxial, counter-rotating system of two, two-bladed rotors. A large tailfin provided directional stability, and the aircraft was controlled by a handlebar system extending over the pilot's head to the rotor hub.

Specifications

References
 Bensen Aircraft Foundation 
 Vortech page on B-9
 

1950s United States sport aircraft
B-09
Homebuilt aircraft
1950s United States helicopters
Aircraft first flown in 1958
Single-engined piston helicopters